Anastasia Markova (born ) is a Russian female volleyball player. She is part of the Russia women's national volleyball team.

She participated in the 2014 FIVB Volleyball World Grand Prix.
On club level she played for Dinamo Moscow in 2014.

References

External links
 Profile at FIVB.org

1987 births
Living people
Russian women's volleyball players
Place of birth missing (living people)
20th-century Russian women
21st-century Russian women